David Byrne is the fourth studio album by Scottish-American musician David Byrne, released in 1994. "Angels" and "Back in the Box" were the two main singles released from the album. The first one entered the US Modern Rock Tracks chart, reaching #24.

The album spent six weeks on the Billboard 200 chart.

Part of the song "Lilies of the Valley" can be heard sampled on Talib Kweli 's "Right About Now", the leadoff track from his 2006 Right About Now: The Official Sucka Free Mix CD.

The music video for "Angels" appeared in an episode of Beavis and Butt-Head.

Track listing
All tracks written by David Byrne.

Personnel
David Byrne – vocals, guitar, synthesizer, clavinet, bells, balafon, lap steel guitar
Mark Edwards – drones
Bebel Gilberto – background vocals
Sue Hadjopoulos – percussion
Bashiri Johnson – percussion, bongos, chimes, conga, shaker
Arto Lindsay – guitar
Dolette McDonald – background vocals
John Medeski – organ, synthesizer, Farfisa
Valerie Naranjo – drums, percussion, marimba, shaker, talking drum, percussion sampling
Marcus Rojas – tuba
Paul Socolow – bass
Todd Turkisher – drums, percussion, surdo, sampling, doumbek, roto toms, frame drum, trash cans
Bill Ware – marimba, vibraphone

Release history

References

1994 albums
Albums produced by David Byrne
David Byrne albums
Luaka Bop albums
Sire Records albums
Warner Records albums